Rubén José Agüero (born 20 February 1960) is an Argentine retired footballer who played as a defender, and is a manager. He competed in the men's tournament at the 1988 Summer Olympics.

References

External links
 
 

1960 births
Living people
Sportspeople from Mendoza Province
Argentine footballers
Association football defenders
Argentine Primera División players
Primera Nacional players
Gimnasia y Esgrima de Mendoza footballers
Estudiantes de La Plata footballers
Club Atlético Lanús footballers
S.D. Quito footballers
Argentina international footballers
Olympic footballers of Argentina
Footballers at the 1988 Summer Olympics
Argentine expatriate footballers
Argentine expatriate sportspeople in Ecuador
Expatriate footballers in Ecuador
Argentine football managers
San Martín de San Juan managers
Defensa y Justicia managers